The men's hammer throw at the 2007 All-Africa Games was held on July 21, 2007.

Results

References
Results

Hammer